NATO EPVAT testing is one of the three recognized classes of procedures used in the world to control the safety and quality of firearms ammunition.

Beside this, there are also the Commission Internationale Permanente pour l'Epreuve des Armes à Feu Portatives (C.I.P.) class of procedures and the Sporting Arms and Ammunition Manufacturers' Institute (SAAMI) class of procedures.

EPVAT Testing is described in unclassified documents by NATO, more precisely by the AC/225 Army Armaments Group (NAAG).

EPVAT is an abbreviation for "Electronic Pressure Velocity and Action Time". Action Time here means the (short amount of) time required between the ignition of the primer and the projectile leaving the barrel. This is a comprehensive procedure for testing ammunition using state-of-the-art instruments and computers. The procedure itself is described in NATO document AC/225 (Com. III/SC.1)D/200.

Unlike the C.I.P. procedures aiming only at the user's safety, the NATO procedures for ammunition testing also includes comprehensive functional quality testing in relation with the intended use. That is, not only the soldier's safety is looked at, but also his capacity to incapacitate the enemy. As a result, for every ammunition order by NATO, a complete acceptance approval on both safety and functionality is performed by both NATO and the relevant ammunition manufacturers in a contradictory fashion.

For this, a highly accurate and indisputable protocol has been defined by NATO experts using a system of reference cartridges.

The civilian organisations C.I.P. and SAAMI use less comprehensive test procedures than NATO, but NATO test centres have the advantage that only a few chamberings are in military use. The C.I.P. and SAAMI proof houses must be capable of testing hundreds of different chamberings requiring many different test barrels, etc..

NATO Reference cartridges system 
In this system, the ammunition manufacturers, in close cooperation with NATO, have set aside a batch (also termed "lot") of ammunition they consider to be of very good quality and representative of ammunition that should be delivered to the armies in the following years. This batch is maintained at approved NATO test centres and distributed to the manufacturers involved. When a new batch (lot) is delivered, a set of 20 reference cartridges are fired to see how they behave with the local equipment and with the current atmospheric conditions. Results are then compared to the reference values, as maintained by NATO and correctors (delta values) are computed. Then, the current batch (lot) of ammunition is fired and the correctors are applied on the measured value giving a result "comparable" to the reference itself.

Proofing 

The minimum proof and performance requirements for small arms ammunition of NATO calibres are covered in STANAGs as follows:
 5.56 mm. STANAG 4172 and NATO Manual of Proof and Inspection AC/225 (LG/3-SG/1) D/8.
 7.62 mm. STANAG 2310 and NATO Manual of Proof and Inspection AC/225 (LG/3-SG/1) D/9.
 9 mm. STANAG 4090 and NATO Manual of Proof and Inspection AC/225 (P111-SP1) D/170(REV).
 12.7 mm. STANAG 4383 and NATO Manual of Proof and Inspection AC/225 (LG/3-SG/1) D/11.

Each weapon and component considered vulnerable to the effects of a rapid change in pressure, for example barrels, breech blocks and bolts, will be tested by firing one dry round at a corrected minimum of 25% over pressure and one oiled round at a corrected minimum of 25% over pressure. 25% over pressure means 25% in excess of the Service Pressure (Pmax).

Each weapon will be individually tested, from an ammunition lot that produces a minimum corrected mean chamber pressure in accordance with the table below:

The above proof round pressure requirements for the 9 mm and 12.7 mm rounds established by the British Ministry of Defence are higher than the current (2008) C.I.P. proof round pressure requirement legislation for the civilian equivalent 9mm Parabellum (C.I.P. Pmax rating 235 MPA / (34,083 psi) and .50 Browning (C.I.P. Pmax rating 370 MPA / (53,663 psi) rounds. The 9×19mm NATO and 12.7×99mm NATO rounds can be regarded as overpressure ammunition

Unlike the civilian C.I.P. test procedures NATO EPVAT testing procedures for the "NATO chamberings" require the pressure sensor or transducer to be mounted ahead of the case mouth. The advantage of this mounting position is that there is no need to drill the cartridge case to mount the transducer. Drilling prior to firing is always a time-consuming process (fast quality control and feedback to production is essential during the ammunition manufacturing process). The disadvantage of this mount is that the pressure rises much faster than in a drilled cartridge case. This causes high frequency oscillations of the pressure sensor (approx 200 kHz for a Kistler 6215 transducer) and this requires electronic filtering with the drawback that filtering also affects the lower harmonics where a peak is found causing a slight error in the measurement. This slight error is not always well mastered and this causes a lot of discussion about the filter order, cutoff frequency and its type (Bessel or Butterworth).

Since NATO EPVAT uses technically differing proof test standards than SAAMI and C.I.P. do, EPVAT pressures cannot be directly compared with SAAMI and C.I.P. pressures.

See also 
 NATO
 NATO cartridge
 Small arms ammunition pressure testing
 Overpressure ammunition
 CIP, a European standardization organization for firearm cartridges
 SAAMI, an American standardization organization for firearm cartridges
 DEVA, a German firearms test institute
 Wildcat cartridge

References
Notes

Bibliography
 Proof of Ordnance, Munitions, Armour and Explosives, Ministry of Defence Defence Standard 05-101 Part 1 – Requirements (Archived)
Proof of Ordnance, Munitions, Armour and Explosives, Ministry of Defence Defence Standard 05-101 Part 2 – Guidance (Archived)
 Proof of Ordnance, Munitions, Armour and Explosives, Ministry of Defence Defence Standard 05-101 Part 3 – Statistical Methods for Proof (Archived)
 NATO Small Arms Ammunition Interchangeability via Direct Evidence Testing (Archived)
 C.I.P. decisions, texts and tables  CD-ROM version download (ZIP and RAR format) (Archived)
 NATO STANDARD AEP-97  MULTI-CALIBRE MANUAL OF PROOF AND INSPECTION (M-CMOPI) FOR NATO SMALL ARMS AMMUNITION VOLUME 8 NATO REFERENCE AMMUNITION Edition A Version 1 (from page 261) Archived

External links 
Army Armaments Group (NAAG) (Archived)
Thales brochure on 5.56mm F1 ball ammunition conforming to the design parameters of the NATO STANAG 4172 and tested with Kistler 6215 transducers at different temperatures (Archived)
THE ANALYSIS OF APPLICATION AND REQUIREMENTS SMALL CALIBER REFERENCE AMMUNITION AND POLISH ACHIEVEMENT IN THE FIELD OF WORKING OUT NATIONAL REFERENCE AMMUNITION Archived
NATO Small Arms Ammunition Interchangeability via Direct Evidence Testing 25 May 2011 (Archived)
Pressure and accuracy test barrels for ammunition testing to SAAMI, CIP or NATO standard Archived

Ammunition
Firearms
Firearm safety
NATO standardisation